Forth Valley College is a college of further education located in Scotland. The college was established in 2005 from the merger of Falkirk College and Clackmannan College. It currently operates from three main campuses in Falkirk, Alloa and Stirling. The college previously operated within a community campus in the Raploch area of Stirling as well. 

Forth Valley College annually enrolls over 13,500 students and offers courses from access to degree level.

Campuses

Raploch Community Campus (2007–2022) 
The Raploch Community Campus opened in October 2007. In May 2022, the college announced plans to pull out from the Raploch Community Campus as part of budget cuts made in the wake of the COVID-19 pandemic, Brexit, and allocation of outside funding.

Alloa Campus (2011–present) 

The Alloa Campus officially opened in September 2011. The campus has a hair and beauty training salon which is run by students and is open to the public.

Stirling Campus (2012–present) 
The Stirling Campus officially opened in September 2012. The campus has its own training restaurant called The Gallery which is run by students and is open to the public for its lunch and dinner menus.

New Falkirk Campus (2020–present) 

The new Falkirk campus and college headquarters officially opened in January 2020. It was designed by Reiach and Hall Architects. It is the largest of all the campuses, possessing a number of different buildings. These include the main building which stands two storeys tall and includes a canteen, gym, the library and classrooms. There are also two single-storey wooden buildings. The campus is also home to a practice plant which allows chemical engineering students to gain practice in certain types of operations. The college is located close to the ground of Falkirk F.C., central retail park and the border of Falkirk and Grangemouth. 

The Falkirk campus, similar to the Alloa campus, also houses a hair and beauty training salon which is run by students and is open to the public.

In July 2022, Falkirk campus was shortlisted for the Stirling Prize for excellence in architecture, and the RIAS Andrew Doolan Best Building in Scotland Award.

Academics 
Forth Valley College offers education and training courses from access to degree level within multiple modes of attendance including full-time, part-time, evening, flexible study, and online. The college also provides vocational training and professional qualifications.

Forth Valley offers courses within nine teaching departments including:

 Access and Progression
 Applied Science, Maths and Mechanical Engineering
 Business
 Business Development
 Care, Health and Sport
 Construction
 Creative Industries
 Electrical, Instrumentation and Chemical Engineering
 Hospitality and Salon Services.

References

External links
Forth Valley College website

Further education colleges in Scotland
Higher education colleges in Scotland
Education in Falkirk (council area)
Education in Stirling (council area)
Education in Clackmannanshire
Buildings and structures in Falkirk (council area)
Buildings and structures in Stirling (council area)
Buildings and structures in Clackmannanshire
Educational institutions established in 2005
2005 establishments in Scotland